Stephen P. Joyce (born c. 1961) is an American Business man. He was the chief executive officer of Dine Brands Global, the operator of IHOP and Applebee's franchises. Currently serves as CEO and Director of Re/Max International.

Early life
Joyce was born circa 1961. He is of Irish descent.

Joyce holds a bachelors degrees in Commerce from the University of Virginia and has done graduate work at the Wharton School of the University of Pennsylvania, Cornell University and the Aspen Institute.

Career
Joyce worked for Marriott International for 25 years. 

From 2008 to 2017, Joyce served as the president and CEO Choice Hotels. During his tenure, in the fall of 2010, he was features on an episode of the CBS reality TV series Undercover Boss. 

Joyce served as the CEO of Dine Brands Global from September 2017 to February 2021, and since March 2022 has served as the CEO and Director Re/Max.

References

https://news.remax.com/bio/stephen-joyce

Living people
1960s births
American people of Irish descent
University of Virginia alumni
American chief executives of food industry companies